Evolve Wrestling was an American professional wrestling promotion which was founded in 2010 by former Ring of Honor booker and Dragon Gate USA vice president, Gabe Sapolsky. Over the course of its history, it held 146 events.

Evolve 1: Richards vs. Ibushi

The inaugural Evolve show, Evolve 1: Richards vs. Ibushi, was held in Rahway, New Jersey at the Rahway Rec Center. Lenny Leonard and Leonard F. Chikarason served as the commentators. In the main event, Davey Richards, accompanied by Kyle O'Reilly and Tony Kozina, faced against Kota Ibushi, who was accompanied by Michael Nakazawa.

Evolve 2: Hero vs. Hidaka

Elimination match

Evolve 3: Rise Or Fall

Evolve 4: Danielson vs. Fish

Evolve 5: Danielson vs. Sawa

Evolve 6: Aries vs. Taylor

Evolve 7: Aries Vs. Moxley

Evolve 8: Style Battle

Evolve 8: Style Battle, was held in Union City, New Jersey at The ACE Arena. The show featured the Style Battle, a one night tournament between eight wrestlers that representing different wrestling style, who was won by A. R. Fox.

Tournament participants

Style Battle tournament

Eight-way fray match

Evolve 9: Gargano vs. Taylor

Evolve 10: A Tribute To The Arena

Evolve 11: Finlay vs. Callihan

Evolve 12: Fox vs. Callihan

Evolve 13: Gargano vs. Fox

Evolve 14: Generico vs. del Sol

Evolve 15: Generico vs. del Sol II

Evolve 16: Davis vs. Fish

Evolve 17: Generico vs. del Sol III

Evolve 18: Gargano vs. Callihan

Evolve 19: Crowning the Champion

{{Pro wrestling results table
"tournament Final Four"
|times= 
|results=

|match1 = Sami Callihan defeated Jigsaw, Rich Swann and Samuray del Sol by submission
|stip1= Tournament quarter-final four-way freestyle match 
|time1 = N/A

|match2 = A. R. Fox defeated Jon Davis by disqualification
|stip2= Tournament quarter-final match
|time2 = 14:02

|match3 = Brian Kendrick and Johnny Gargano defeated The Gentleman's Club (Drew Gulak and Orange Cassidy) (with Dr. Colonel Nolan Angus and The Swamp Monster)
|stip3= Tag team match
|time3 = 13:59

|match4 = Sami Callihan defeated Chuck Taylor by submission
|stip4= Tournament semi-final match
|time4 = 8:37

|match5 = A. R. Fox defeated Ricochet
|stip5= Tournament semi-final match
|time5 = 12:54

|match6 = Arik Cannon defeated Scott Reed (with Caleb Konley, Larry Dallas and Trina Michaels)
|stip6= No Disqualification match
|time6 = 7:28

|match7 = The Super Smash Brothers (Player Dos and Player Uno) defeated The Young Bucks (Matt Jackson and Nick Jackson)
|stip7= Tag team match
|time7 = 14:14

|match8 = A. R. Fox defeated Sami Callihan
|stip8= Tournament final match for the Evolve Championship
|time8 = 19:11
}}

Evolve 20: Fox vs. Jackson

Six-way fray match

Evolve 21: USA vs. The World

Evolve 22: Gargano vs. del Sol

Evolve 23: Fox vs. Nese

Evolve 24: Fox vs. Ricochet

Evolve 25: Fox vs. Richards

Evolve 26: Hero vs. Nese

Evolve 27: Gargano vs. Nation

Evolve 28: Hero vs. Barreta

Evolve 29: Fox/Nation vs. Nese/Barreta

Evolve 30: Barreta Vs. Nation

Evolve 31: Hero vs. Galloway

Evolve 32: Sydal vs. Ricochet

Evolve 33: Gargano vs. Swann - Evolution's End

Evolve 34: Galloway vs. Swann

Evolve 35

Elimination match

Evolve 36

Evolve 37

Evolve 38

Evolve 39

Evolve 40

Evolve 41

Evolve 42

Evolve 43

Evolve 44

Evolve 45

Evolve 46

Evolve 47

Evolve 48

Evolve 49

Evolve 50

Evolve 51

Evolve 52

Evolve 53

Evolve 54

Evolve 55

Evolve 56

Evolve 57

Evolve 58

Evolve 59

Evolve 60

Evolve 61

Evolve 62

Evolve 63

Cruiserweight Classic Flashpoint match

Evolve 64

Evolve 65

Evolve 66

Evolve 67

Evolve 68

Evolve 69: A Farewell To An Icon

Evolve 70

Evolve 71

Evolve 72

Evolve 73

Elimination match

Evolve 74

Evolve 75

Evolve 76: A Hero's Exit - Part 1

Evolve 77: A Hero's Exit - Part 2

Evolve 78

Evolve 79

Evolve 80

Evolve 81

Evolve 82

Evolve 83

Evolve 84

Evolve 85

Evolve 86

Evolve 87

Evolve 88

Evolve 89

Evolve 90

Evolve 91

Evolve 92

Evolve 93

Evolve 94

Evolve 95

Elimination match

Evolve 96

Evolve 97

Evolve 98

Evolve 99

Evolve 100

Evolve 101

Four-way elimination match

Evolve 102

Evolve 103

Evolve 104

Evolve 105

Evolve 106

Evolve 107

Evolve 108

Evolve 109

Evolve 110

Evolve 111

Evolve 112

Evolve 113

Evolve 114

Evolve 115

Evolve 116

Evolve 117

Evolve 118

Evolve 119

Evolve 120

Evolve 121

Evolve 122

Evolve 123

Evolve 124

Evolve 125

Evolve 126

Evolve 127

Evolve 128

Evolve 129

Evolve 130

Evolve's 10th Anniversary Celebration

Evolve 132

Evolve 133

Evolve 134

Evolve 135

Evolve 136

Evolve 137

Evolve 138

Evolve 139

Evolve 140

Evolve 141

Evolve 142

Evolve 143

Evolve 144

Evolve 145

Evolve 146

References

Professional wrestling-related lists
Professional wrestling shows
Evolve (professional wrestling)